The 2016 TCR Asia Series season is the second season of the TCR Asia Series.

Teams and drivers
Michelin is the official tyre supplier, but Neric Wei and Edgar Lau used Yokohama tyres at Macau.

Calendar and results
The 2016 schedule was announced on 14 December 2015, with six events scheduled. Later, the round in Sepang (7 August) was canceled and a round in Shanghai was added.

Championship standings

Drivers' championship

† – Drivers did not finish the race, but were classified as they completed over 75% of the race distance.

Teams' Championship

† – Drivers did not finish the race, but were classified as they completed over 75% of the race distance.

References

External links
 

TCR Asia Series
TCR Asia Series season